San Vicente Municipality may refer to:
Colombia
San Vicente, Antioquia
El Salvador
San Vicente, El Salvador
Philippines
San Vicente, Camarines Norte
San Vicente, Ilocos Sur
San Vicente, Palawan
San Vicente, Northern Samar

Municipality name disambiguation pages